Salah Al-Yahri (Arabic:صلاح اليهري) (born 25 August 1995) is a Qatari footballer.

External links

References

Qatari footballers
1995 births
Living people
Muaither SC players
El Jaish SC players
Al-Gharafa SC players
Al-Khor SC players
Al-Rayyan SC players
Al Ahli SC (Doha) players
Qatar Stars League players
Aspire Academy (Qatar) players
Association football midfielders
Footballers at the 2018 Asian Games
Asian Games competitors for Qatar
Qatar youth international footballers